The venerable collared lizard (Crotaphytus antiquus) is a species of lizard in the genus Crotaphytus in the family Crotaphytidae. The species is native to northern Mexico.

Geographic range
C. antiquus is restricted to the area of Sierra San Lorenzo, Texas, and Sierra Solis in extreme southwestern Coahuila state.

Reproduction
C. antiquus is oviparous.

Conservation status
C. antiquus is classified as Endangered (EN) on the IUCN Red List. Major threats to the population include habitat degradation, mainly due to gravel extraction for building materials in nearby urban areas.

References

Further reading
Axtell, Ralph W.; Webb, Robert G. (1995). "Two new Crotaphytus from southern Coahuila and the adjacent states of east-central Mexico". Bull. Chicago Acad. Sci. 16 (2): 1–15. (Crotaphytus antiquus, new species).

Crotaphytus
Reptiles  described in 1995
Taxa named by Robert G. Webb